Alexander Barrett Klots (December 12, 1903 in New York City – April 18, 1989 in Putnam, Connecticut) was an American entomologist who specialised in Lepidoptera.
	
His collection is conserved in the American Museum of Natural History, a smaller part is held by the University of Connecticut.

Two moth species, Neodactria glenni and Neodactria daemonis, were described in the early 21st century using the authority of Bernard Landry and Klots. The specimens had been collected and described by Klots but not published and were published by Landry in 2002 and 2005 respectively.

Works
partial list
1933 Directions for Collecting and Preserving Insects. Wards Natural Science Establishment, Rochester, New York. 30 pp. [with two later editions].
1959 with Elsie B. Klots. Living Insects of the World. Garden City, N.Y Doubleday full text
1977 with Elsie Broughton Klots 1001 Questions Answered About Insects. New York, Dodd, Mead 
1978 Field Guide to the Butterflies of North America East of the Great Plains. Houghton Mifflin

References

Sokoloff, P. (1989). [Klots, A. B.] The Entomologist's Record and Journal of Variation. London, 101 (9/10): 236.
Fowler, G. (1989). [Klots, A. B.] News of the Lepidopterists' Society, Lawrence, 1989 (5): 70–71.
Wagner, D. L. (1992). "Obituaries Alexander Barrett Klots (1903-1989)" Journal of the Lepidopterists' Society, Los Angeles, 46 (4): 314–324. Includes photographs of Klots and bibliography.

American lepidopterists
1989 deaths
1903 births
20th-century American zoologists